Polona Hercog defeated Iga Świątek in the final, 6–3, 3–6, 6–3 to win the women's singles tennis title at the 2019 Ladies Lugano Open. It was Świątek's first WTA Tour final.

Elise Mertens was the reigning champion, but did not participate.

Seeds

Draw

Finals

Top half

Bottom half

Qualifying

Seeds

Qualifiers

Draw

First qualifier

Second qualifier

Third qualifier

Fourth qualifier

Fifth qualifier

Sixth qualifier

References

External links
Main Draw
Qualifying Draw

Ladies Open Lugano - Singles
Ladies Open Lugano
Lugano